Victor Aramoana is a New Zealand rugby league player who represented Wellington.

Playing career
Aramoana made his senior debut in 1983 for the Upper Hutt Tigers in the Wellington Rugby League competition and also played his first match for Wellington that same year.

Aramoana also played for the New Zealand Māori side.

In 1992 he became only the seventh player to play 50 games for Wellington. He retired in 1994, having played 54 games for Wellington and scored 328 tries for Upper Hutt.

References

New Zealand rugby league players
New Zealand Māori rugby league players
New Zealand Māori rugby league team players
Rugby league wingers
Upper Hutt Tigers players
Wellington rugby league team players
Place of birth missing (living people)
Year of birth missing (living people)
Living people